Junje Gowda is the legendary builder of the Male Mahadeshwara temple in hanur taluk of Chamarajanagara District. He was a local landlord belonging to the Kuruba Gowda community and a devotee of Shri Mahadeshwara Swamy.

Legend 
Legend has it that Lord Mahadeshwara visited the house of Junje Gowda, a wealthy landlord of the Kuruba caste and a devotee of the god Beredevara. There he performed miracles to convince Junje Gowda of his power and in the end won Junje Gowda to his following. Junje Gowda is said to be responsible for all the temples built in the mountainous region of eastern Karnataka called the Mahadeshwara Hills.
But the Junje Gowda family is still living the village called Kadamboor, in Hanur taluk. Chamarajangar district.

 Now the family  is eager to visit the male mahadeshwara temple to see their great grandfather's  work.
It is believed that when his cows were suffering from a disease, he prayed saint Mahadeshwara to save them. The lord melted to his devotion and asked him to build a temple in Nadumale one of the seven hills as an offering.

External links
 

Indian Shaivite religious leaders
Indian landlords